Skippy is an American comic strip written and drawn by Percy Crosby that was published from 1923 to 1945. A highly popular, acclaimed and influential feature about rambunctious fifth-grader Skippy Skinner, his friends and his enemies, it was adapted into movies, a novel and a radio show. It was commemorated on a 1997 U.S. Postal Service stamp and was the basis for a wide range of merchandising—although perhaps the most well-known product bearing the Skippy name, Skippy peanut butter, used the name without Crosby's authorization, leading to a protracted trademark conflict.

An early influence on cartoonist Charles Schulz and an inspiration for his Peanuts, Skippy is considered one of the classics of the form. In Vanity Fair, humorist Corey Ford described it as "America's most important contribution to humor of the century", while comics historian John A. Lent wrote, "The first half-century of the comics spawned many kid strips, but only one could be elevated to the status of classic... which innovated a number of sophisticated and refined touches used later by Charles Schulz and Bill Watterson..." Comics artist Jerry Robinson said,
{{blockquote|Nothing like Skippy had ever been seen before in the comic strips. It was not just Skippy'''s expert draftsmanship or remarkable flair, although that artistry earned its creator a reputation as "the cartoonist's cartoonist"... The brilliance of Skippy was that here was fantasy with a realistic base, the first kid cartoon with a definable and complex personality grounded in daily life.}}Skippy started in 1923 as a cartoon in Life and became a syndicated comic strip two years later through King Features Syndicate. Creator Crosby retained the copyright, a rarity for comic strip artists of the time.

Characters and story
The strip focused on Skippy Skinner, a young boy living in the city. Usually wearing an enormous collar and tie and a floppy checked hat, he was an odd mix of mischief and melancholy who might equally be found stealing from the corner fruit stand, failing to master skates or baseball, complaining about the adult world, or staring sadly at an old relative's grave ("And only last year she gave me a tie").

The syndicated strip was enormously popular, at one point guaranteeing Crosby $2,350 a week, more than the United States president.Skippy had several topper strips on the Sunday page: Always Belittlin' (Oct 17, 1926 - 1940), Comic Letter (April 22 - Sept 16, 1934) and Bug Lugs (Feb 17 - Aug 18, 1935).

During the World War II years, Crosby's conservative politics increasingly intruded on the strip, and it began to lose readers. Negotiations on a new contract failed, and Crosby ended Skippy in 1945. Crosby's final years were tragic; he was unable to find steady work and drifted into alcoholism. After a 1949 suicide attempt, he was placed in the asylum at Kings Park, New York, where he died in 1964, unable to secure release.

In other media
Grosset & Dunlap published Crosby's Skippy novel in 1929. There were Skippy dolls, toys and comic books. The strip was adapted as a movie by Paramount.

The 1931 comedy film Skippy starring Jackie Cooper was based on the comic strip. It won director Norman Taurog the Academy Award for Best Director and boosted the career of its young star. Crosby disliked the film and, though he had to allow the production of a previously contracted sequel, Sooky, released the same year, he never let another Skippy movie be made.

In 1937, to replace Walt Disney's Mickey Mouse and Silly Symphony cartoons, an attempt to adapt the cartoons was made by Mayfair Productions for United Artists. Only one cartoon, "The Dog Catcher" was produced and released.

Radio dramatist Robert Hardy Andrews wrote the daytime, children's radio serial Skippy, sponsored by General Mills.

Trademark conflict
In the 1930s, the  Alameda, California, food packer Rosefield Packing Co., Ltd. began to sell its newly developed hydrogenated peanut butter, which it labeled "Skippy" without Crosby's permission. Percy Crosby had the trademark invalidated in 1934, but Rosefield persisted after Crosby was committed to an asylum, and its successor companies, including Unilever and Hormel (owner since 2013), were granted rights to the trademark over the objection of Crosby's heirs. Years of expensive litigation followed, which Crosby's heirs have continued into the 2000s.

Reprints
In 2012, IDW Publishing started a complete reprint series under "The Library of American Comics", with separate volumes for the daily and Sundays. On September 10, 2012, GoComics also began publishing Skippy dailies online.

 See also 
 Muggs and Skeeter'', a similar strip by Wally Bishop, that began when Skippy's popularity was at its height

References

External links
Skippy at GoComics
Skippy at the Percy Crosby estate. Archived from the original on May 17, 2017.
Skippy at Don Markstein's Toonopedia Archived from the original on June 4, 2017.

American comic strips
Gag-a-day comics
1923 comics debuts
1945 comics endings
Fictional American people
Child characters in comics
American comics characters
American comics adapted into films
Comics adapted into radio series
Comics characters introduced in 1923